Chelsea Lenarduzzi (born 26 November 1995) is an Australian rugby league footballer who plays for the Brisbane Broncos in the NRL Women's Premiership and the Burleigh Bears in the QRL Women's Premiership. 

An Australian and Queensland representative, she has won three premierships with the Broncos.

Background
Born in Bowral, New South Wales and raised in Moss Vale, Lenarduzzi moved to the Gold Coast, Queensland in 2015 to attend university, where she began playing rugby league for the Burleigh Bears. In 2015, 2016 and 2018, she won Australian national titles in shotput.

Lenarduzzi's older brother, Rhys, is an Italian rugby league representative.

Playing career
In 2017, Lenarduzzi made her debut for Queensland in their 6–22 loss to New South Wales.

In 2018, while playing for the Burleigh Bears, Lenarduzzi represented South East Queensland at the Women's National Championships. On 21 June 2018, she signed with the Brisbane Broncos NRL Women's Premiership team.

In Round 1 of the 2018 NRL Women's season, she made her debut for the Broncos in their 30–4 win over the St George Illawarra Dragons.

In 2019, she represented South East Queensland at the Women's National Championships and was selected for Queensland in the Women's State of Origin. On 6 October 2019, she came off the bench and scored a try in the Broncos' 30–6 Grand Final win over the St George Illawarra Dragons. On 25 October 2019, she made her Test for Australia in their 28–8 win over New Zealand at WIN Stadium.

On 25 October 2020, she won her third NRLW premiership with the Broncos, scoring a try in their 20–10 Grand Final win over the Sydney Roosters.

References

External links
Brisbane Broncos profile
NRL profile

1995 births
Living people
People from Bowral
Australian people of Italian descent
Australian female rugby league players
Australia women's national rugby league team players
Rugby league props
Brisbane Broncos (NRLW) players
Australian female shot putters
Rugby league players from New South Wales